The Third Way is a former political party (founded on 17 March 1990) and now a think tank. Third Way has supported a system of federalism for the UK with the possibility of a future break-up, an isolationist foreign policy, environmentalism, the wide use of Swiss-style citizens' initiatives and distributism.

It should not be confused with the Third Way ideology promoted by Tony Blair, Bill Clinton and Gerhard Schröder, which it condemns as a revised form of social democracy. It is not related to the Christian Third Way magazine.

Ideology
Third Way describes itself as:

a think-tank dedicated to creating a society based on Justice, Community and Individual freedom against one that is based on Greed, Globalisation and Tyranny.
Third Way stands against all forms of social injustice, racism and religious bigotry. Third Way is for everyone. We promote positive ideas and apart from this website also publish printed material. We advocate Direct Democracy along Swiss lines using referenda and citizens’ initiatives.
We support small business and co-operative ownership.

Leading members
Patrick Harrington, founder 
David Kerr, has stood for election as an Ulster Third Way candidate in Belfast

Links
Third Way supported the English Lobby, a pressure group and electoral coalition founded in 2004 that campaigns for the recognition of St George's Day and the creation of an English parliament.

Third Way supporters assisted in the foundation of the trade union Solidarity – The Union for British Workers.

Associated publications
The Third Way has operated, or is closely associated with, various publications and websites, including:
 Ulster Nation magazine and website
 Counter-Culture magazine and website 
 Liverpool Newsletter, a distributist publication formerly edited by Anthony Cooney and now published by Third Way.

National Liberal party
In 1999, new electoral organisation the National Liberal Party was formed by Patrick Harrington and Graham Williamson and registered as National Liberal Party – The Third Way with the Electoral Commission. It fought parliamentary elections in Hornchurch (in 2001 and 2005), Belfast West (2001, as Ulster Third Way), Upminster (2005) and Eastleigh (2010) but obtained below 1% of the vote in each case.

In the 2014 European elections, the National Liberal Party stood with 8 candidates in the London constituency, gaining 6,736 votes.

See also

 List of think tanks in the United Kingdom

References

External links
 
 National Liberal party website
 Counter Culture website
 Solidarity Trade Union website
 Self-determination day
 The Lost Race BBC documentary featuring Patrick Harrington, Brent Cheetham and David Kerr of Third Way broadcast in 1999

Think tanks based in the United Kingdom
Anti-communist organizations
Far-right politics in the United Kingdom
Third Position